The 1944 Bulgarian coup d'état, also known as the 9 September coup d'état, was a coup that overthrew the government of Kingdom of Bulgaria carried out on the eve of 9 September 1944. During the People's Republic of Bulgaria it was called the People's Uprising of 9 September  – on the grounds of the broad unrest, and Socialist Revolution  – as it was a turning point politically and the beginning of radical reforms towards socialism.

In brief
Bulgaria was in a precarious situation, still in the sphere of Nazi Germany's influence (as a former member of the Axis powers, with German troops in the country despite the declared Bulgarian neutrality 15 days earlier), but under threat of war with the leading military power of that time, the Soviet Union (the USSR had declared war on the Kingdom of Bulgaria 4 days earlier and units of its Third Ukrainian Front of the Red Army had entered Bulgaria 3 days after), and with demonstrations, strikes, revolts in many cities and villages (6 – 7 September) and local government power taken by Bulgarian Fatherland Front (FF) forces (without Red Army help) in Varna, Burgas, etc.

The coup d'état was organized by the Fatherland Front political coalition (led by the Bulgarian Communists) and performed by pro-FF units of the Bulgarian Army and the Bulgarian partisan forces of the People's Liberation Insurgent Army (Народоосвободителна въстаническа армия, НОВА; Narodoosvoboditelna vastanicheska armiya, NOVA).

As a direct result the legal government of Prime Minister Konstantin Muraviev was overthrown and replaced with a government of the FF led by Kimon Georgiev. Bulgaria joined immediately the anti-Nazi coalition of the Allies of World War II and took part in World War II. The Kingdom of Bulgaria became a republic after the Bulgarian republic referendum in 1946. Large-scale political, economic and social changes were introduced to the country. The coup resulted in Bulgaria entering into the Soviet sphere of influence and the beginning of Bulgaria's 45-year-long People's Republic.

Background
On 26 August 1944, the government of Ivan Bagryanov had verbally declared Bulgaria's neutrality in the war under the threat of the Red Army's offensive in neighbouring Romania. At the same time, in Egypt the government had entered separate peace talks with the United Kingdom and the United States, hoping to secure the dispatch of British and American troops in Bulgaria. On the same day, the Central Committee of the Bulgarian Workers' Party (BWP) proclaimed the assumption of power by means of a popular uprising to be its official task.

A government of the Bulgarian Agrarian National Union (BANU) "Vrabcha 1", until then in opposition, was formed on 2 September 1944, headed by Konstantin Muraviev. It continued the peace talks, declared its support for democratic reforms and ordered the withdrawal of German Army troops from Bulgaria. At the same time, the guerrilla actions of the partisans did not cease, the alliance with Nazi Germany was not disbanded and no attempts were made to normalize the relations with Moscow, forcing the Soviet Union to treat the new government with suspicion. On 5 September 1944, the Soviet Union declared war on Bulgaria.

The Central Committee of the BWP and the general staff of the People's Liberation Revolt Army commenced, on 5 September, planning of a coup d'état. The plan was further detailed on 8 September. According to the plan, the coordinated actions of the partisans, the BWP combat groups and the pro-Fatherland Front army detachments would assume power and effective control of government during the night of 9 September. The stated goal of the coup d'état was the "overthrowing of the fascist authorities and the establishment of popular-democratic power of the Fatherland Front".

Unrest began all around Bulgaria on 6 September and 7 September, with the strikes of the Pernik miners and the Sofia tram employees, as well as the general strikes in Plovdiv and Gabrovo. The prisons in Pleven, Varna and Sliven had their political prisoners released; 170 localities were entered by partisan detachments between 6 September and 8 September. In many cities and villages, the strikes and meetings grew into armed clashes with the police, with victims on both sides. On 8 September, the Red Army entered Bulgaria meeting with no opposition on the order of the new Bulgarian government.

Coup d'état
On the eve of 9 September, army units together with Fatherland Front detachments captured key locations in Sofia, such as the Ministry of War, the Ministry of Internal Affairs, the post, the telegraph, the radio, the railway station, etc. Early in the morning, the new Prime Minister Kimon Georgiev informed the people on the radio of the shuffle:

On 9 September, on the order of the NOVA commander-in-chief Dobri Terpeshev, all partisan units descended from the mountains and took over villages and cities' governments. In most places, this was not met with much resistance, but in other cases army and police units loyal to the old government put up violent resistance to the Fatherland Front forces. In Sofia, Plovdiv, the region of Pernik, Shumen and Haskovo the old regime's supporters were defeated by military action with the army coming under the effective control of the Fatherland Front. The establishment of the new leadership happened at the latest in Haskovo, where partisans and other antifascists seized the artillery barracks on 12 September, but suffered many casualties, as the negotiations with the commanding officers failed to reach a compromise.

As of 9 September, the Red Army had not reached Sofia but remained in northeastern Bulgaria. As the Bulgarian communists were capable of assuming power without any aid.

New government
The Fatherland Front government included representatives of the BWP, BANU "Pladne", the Bulgarian Workers' Social Democratic Party (Wide Socialists) and Zveno. The former Prime Minister Konstantin Muraviev was arrested, as were Tsar Simeon II's regents, members of the former government, and some army detachment heads. On 10 September, the police was abolished and replaced with a popular militia consisting mainly of recent partisans; 8,130 political prisoners were released from the prisons, and the concentration camps of the former regime (e.g. Gonda voda, Krasto pole, Lebane) were closed down. The fascist organizations were banned, as were their publications. The former regents, Prince Kiril, Bogdan Filov, and Nikola Mihov, were executed in February. On 8 September 1946, a referendum about the further destiny of the monarchy was held. Based on the results of the referendum, Bulgaria was declared People's Republic on 15 September 1946.

Aftermath

After 9 September 1944, the Bulgarian Army joined the Third Ukrainian Front and contributed to the defeat of Nazism in Europe, helping drive out the Germans from much of Yugoslavia and Hungary, reaching as far as Klagenfurt in Austria by April 1945. Although Bulgaria was not recognized as a true member of the Allies, it still managed to retain Southern Dobruja which it had acquired in 1940 per the Treaty of Craiova.

The government of Kimon Georgiev established in December 1944 the People's Court according to the international obligation of Bulgaria to condemn the persons (ministers, etc.) guilty for World War II. It became one of the main propellers of the wave of terror in the country. Between 10,000 and 40,000 people were killed or missing in just the first four months after the communist regime overtook Bulgaria.

Bulgarian communists (their Workers' Party renamed to Communist Party) consolidated their leading role in the Fatherland Front coalition, reduced its members from 5 to 2 political parties (together with the Agrarian Union) and led the country consecutively and gradually on the pathway to socialism (after the Soviet model).

The Tarnovo Constitution was overthrown and replaced in 1947 by the new pro-communist republican Dimitrov Constitution after the successful republic referendum in 1946.

See also
 People's Republic of Bulgaria
 1923 Bulgarian coup d'état
 1934 Bulgarian coup d'état
 Military history of Bulgaria during World War II
 Bulgarian government-in-exile
 Armistice between Italy and Allied armed forces
 King Michael's Coup
 Moscow Armistice and Lapland War

References

 
 

Conflicts in 1944
Military coups in Bulgaria
Communist revolutions
1944 in Bulgaria
People's Republic of Bulgaria
1940s coups d'état and coup attempts
Bulgaria–Soviet Union relations
Communism in Bulgaria
September 1944 events